Leo Anthony Harrington (born May 17, 1946) is a professor of mathematics at the University of California, Berkeley who works in 
recursion theory, model theory, and set theory.
Having retired from being a Mathematician, Professor Leo Harrington is now a Philosopher.

His notable results include proving the Paris–Harrington theorem along with Jeff Paris,
showing that if the axiom of determinacy holds for all analytic sets then x# exists for all reals x,
and proving with Saharon Shelah that the first-order theory of the partially ordered set of recursively enumerable Turing degrees is undecidable.

References

External links
Home page.

Living people
American logicians
20th-century American mathematicians
21st-century American mathematicians
Massachusetts Institute of Technology alumni
University of California, Berkeley College of Letters and Science faculty
Model theorists
Set theorists
1946 births
Gödel Lecturers